Curling at the 2006 Winter Olympics was held in the town of Pinerolo, Italy from February 13 to February 24. It proved to be the sleeper hit in terms of television ratings in Italy. According to a CBC feature, curling at the 2006 Winter Games drew 5 million viewers, eclipsing ice hockey and figure skating. This, and the success of the Italian men's curling team created a surge of interest in curling within Italy, where there was no previous tradition of the sport and only a few hundred players.

Summary
Days before the 2006 Winter Games began, the IOC confirmed that the curling competition at the 1924 Winter Olympics was an official event, and not a demonstration event as many authoritative sources had previously claimed. However the IOC itself had never done so. This official confirmation was the culmination of an investigative campaign begun by the Glasgow-based newspaper The Herald , on behalf of the families of the eight Scots who won the first curling Olympic gold medal in Chamonix, France in 1924. The winning team was selected by the Royal Caledonian Curling Club, Perth, the mother club of curling.

Defending champion skips Rhona Martin of Great Britain & Northern Ireland and Pål Trulsen of Norway returned to defend their gold medals. Joining Martin on the women's side were 2005 World champion  Anette Norberg of Sweden, 2002 World Junior champion Cassandra Johnson  of the United States of America, two-time world champion Dordi Nordby of Norway, 1996 European champion Mirjam Ott of Switzerland, 2004 Canadian Mixed champion Shannon Kleibrink of Canada, 2005 European Junior Challenge champion Ludmila Privivkova of Russia, three time Pacific Curling champion Ayumi Onodera of Japan, 1994 European champion Dorthe Holm of Denmark, and for the host country, 2003 World Junior bronze medalist Diana Gaspari from Italy.

Joining Trulsen on the men's side was 2001 World Junior Champion Brad Gushue of Canada with the help of two-time World champion Russ Howard calling the shots, former World Junior champion and European champion David Murdoch of Great Britain, two-time European champion Andy Kapp of Germany, 2000 European champion and 2005 European mixed champion Markku Uusipaavalniemi of Finland, 1993 World Championship bronze medalist Pete Fenson of the United States of America, 1997 World Junior champion Ralph Stöckli of Switzerland, three-time Pacific Curling champion Sean Becker of New Zealand, three-time World Champion Peja Lindholm of Sweden, and the host Italian team skipped by Joel Retornaz.

{| id=toc
!Fixtures and results
|-
|Women's: Teams - Standings - Schedule - Percentages - Final standings Draw 1 2 3 4 5 6 7 8 9 10 11 12 Semi-finals - Bronze medal game - Gold medal game|-
|Men's: Teams - Standings - Schedule - Percentages - Final standings Draw 1 2 3 4 5 6 7 8 9 10 11 12 Semi-finals - Bronze medal game - Gold medal game
|-
| Olympic qualifying
|-
| External links
|}

Women's

Women's tournament

Teams

Standings

Schedule

Draw 1 - Monday, February 13, 1400Note: hammers denote the team that had the last stone in the first end.Draw 2 - Tuesday, February 14, 0900

Draw 3 - Tuesday, February 14, 1900

Draw 4 - Wednesday, February 15, 1400

Draw 5 - Thursday, February 16, 0900

Draw 6 - Thursday, February 16, 1900

Draw 7 - Friday, February 17, 1400

Draw 8 - Saturday, February 18, 0900

Draw 9 - Saturday, February 18, 1900

Draw 10 - Sunday, February 19, 1400

Draw 11 - Monday, February 20, 0900

Draw 12 - Monday, February 20, 1900

Semi-finals - Wednesday, February 22, 1400

1 vs. 4 
In a close game, Sweden's Anette Norberg (1) edged out Norway's Dordi Nordby (4). The turning point of the game came in the eighth end when Sweden scored the only steal of the game. From this point on the Swedish team was ahead. Anette Norberg curled 85% while Dordi Nordby struggled, which was the difference in the game.

2 vs. 3 
In the other semi-final, Canada's Shannon Kleibrink team (3) faced off against Mirjam Ott of Switzerland (2). After Ott scored 3 in the third end getting a split off a rock in front of the house, Kleibrink was unable to mount a comeback. The Swiss team managed to keep in the lead for the rest of the game. Mirjam Ott curling 88% in the game ensured victory for the Swiss team, while Shannon Kleibrink struggled at 66%.

Bronze medal game - Thursday, February 23, 1300
Canada scored four in the first end after Dordi Nordby, the Norwegian skip flopped her rock over on a heavy freeze attempt and was removed by Shannon Kleibrink, the Canadian skip on her last rock. With three other Canadian rocks in the house, Canada scored four. Canada never looked back, scoring four more points in the fifth end en route to an 11-5 thrashing of Norway.

Gold medal game - Thursday, February 23, 1730
Sweden held the lead for much of the game, but saw the Swiss team start to claw back late in the game. In the 8th end, a decision by Swedish skip Anette Norberg to hit an unthreatening rock out of the house on her last rock instead of a guard was followed by a great raise of a Swiss rock on to a small corner of the button by Swiss skip Mirjam Ott. This brought the Swiss within one point of a tie. They continued to claw back, and after ten ends the game was tied, so they had to go to another. In the 11th end, the Swiss played a good end, leaving Anette Norberg a difficult double take-out on her last rock to win the gold medal. Norberg was successful, leaving her stone in the house to win the game, and the gold medal, 7–6.

Round robin final player percentagesMinimum 6 games. Five best players from each positionFinal standings

Men's

Men's tournament

Teams

* – Calls the game as a skip normally would
× – The Olympics have recorded the skip as Russ Howard, however the team internally considers that Brad Gushue is skip. It is a team formed by Brad Gushue.

Standings

Schedule

Draw 1 - Monday, February 13, 0900Note: in the following, the hammers denote the team that has the last stone in the first end.Draw 2 - Monday, February 13, 1900

Draw 3 - Tuesday, February 14, 1400

Draw 4 - Wednesday, February 15, 0900

Draw 5 - Wednesday, February 15, 1900

Draw 6 - Thursday, February 16, 1400

Draw 7 - Friday, February 17, 0900

Draw 8 - Friday, February 17, 1900

Draw 9 - Saturday, February 18, 1400

Draw 10 - Sunday, February 19, 0900

Draw 11 - Sunday, February 19, 1900

Draw 12 - Monday, February 20, 1400

Semi-finals - Wednesday, February 22, 1900
1 vs. 4

In a close game, where both teams played extremely well, the game came down to the last rock of the tenth end. Finland (1) had the hammer, and skip Markku Uusipaavalniemi had to put a rock right on the button to win the game. It was either that or a difficult hit and roll off a British (4) rock in the four-foot frozen to a Finnish rock. British skip David Murdoch had an excellent raise hit and roll to make the freeze on his last rock, but it was no match for Markku's draw—giving Finland the win.

2 vs. 3

In the other semi-final, Canada (2) outplayed the Americans (3) for most of the game propelling them to victory. The Americans kept it close for most of the game, always within a few points until the ninth end. With Canada having the hammer, USA skip Pete Fenson had a difficult draw to beat out four Canadian stones and get buried but half of the rock was left out in the open. Canada's skip Brad Gushue peeled off Fenson's rock on his last, giving Gushue five points, at which point the American team conceded.

Bronze medal game - Friday, February 24, 1300
US skip Pete Fenson got the victory after hitting a British stone in the open on his last shot of the game, giving him the only point he needed in the 8–6 victory. The momentum for the Americans began in the third end however, when the Americans scored a three-ender. David Murdoch, the British skip tried to draw to the button on top of two American stones, but was a few inches short, leaving the rock in the open. It was easily tapped out by Fenson giving the Americans three points, and they never trailed after that point, going on to win the country's first Olympic curling medal. The game was interrupted by a streaker wearing a rubber chicken, prompting one of the British players to joke, "Are you Scottish?"

Gold medal game - Friday, February 24, 1730

After Finland skip Markku Uusipaavalniemi missed an opportunity with the hammer in the 1st end, scoring only two points instead of three (0-2), Canada dominated and scored two points with the hammer in the 2nd end (2-2) before stealing the next two ends with a point in each (4-2). Finland finally won a point with the hammer in the 5th end to reduce the deficit (4-3), but numerous Finnish mistakes led to Canada's scoring six points in the 6th end  (10-3), which effectively won the match and secured the gold medal. Brad Gushue of Canada actually had the chance to score an unusual seventh point with the hammer, but his draw shot had too much weight and together with some furious sweeping at the house by the Finland skip, it passed through the house. As it is, six is very unusual as well, and Gushue blamed the miss on nerves.

However, Gushue's miss was of little consequence due to Canada's lead. By this time, Finland wanted to concede, but had to carry on until the 8th end before being allowed to do so. They finished 10–4 with no points in the 7th end and one point in the 8th end. It was Canada's first gold medal in men's curling after winning silver at Nagano in 1998 and Salt Lake City in 2002. School children in Newfoundland and Labrador, where four of the five Canadians are from, had the afternoon off from school to watch the game. Those four Newfoundlanders were the first to ever win a gold medal at the Olympics. Mark Nichols, Canada's third, played phenomenally with a 97% shooting percentage. His raise-triple take-out in the sixth end was a major factor in Canada's scoring the six-point rarity.

Round robin final player percentagesMinimum 6 games. Five best players from each positionFinal standings

Olympic qualifying

Canada

The Canadian Olympic trials took place  December 3–11, 2005 in Halifax, Nova Scotia.

Women

Tie-Breaker
Lawton 9-4 Middaugh

Playoffs
Semi-Final: Kleibrink 5-4 Lawton
Final: Kleibrink 8-7 Scott

Men

Playoffs
Semi-Final: Stoughton 8-6 Morris
Final: Gushue 8-7 Stoughton

Germany
The German Olympic trials were held on three weekends as part of a triple round-robin with no playoffs. The first weekend was played in Schwenningen on February 20–22 The second in Hamburg on March 3–6 and the third weekend was played in Baden-Hills on March 11–13. Only the men's teams qualified for the Olympics.

Final standings

Switzerland
The Swiss Olympic trials were held March 3–6, 2005 in Bern.

 Women 

Playoffs
1 vs. 2: (best of 3) Ott 9-3 Ebnöther; Ebnöther 4-5 Ott
3 vs. 4: (best of 3) Trinzoni 5-11 Strausak; Strausak 2-8 Trinzoni; Trinzoni 8-9 Strausak
Semi-final: (best of 3) Ebnöther 3-7 Strausak; Strausak 4-8 Ebnöther; Ebnöther 10-5 Strausak
Final: (best of 3) Ott 7-4 Ebnöther; Ebnöther 9-3 Ott; Ott 8-7 Ebnöther (EE)

 Men 

Playoffs
Final: (best of 5) Stöckli 6-8 Schwaller; Schwaller 5-3 Stöckli; Stöckli 7-5 Schwaller; Schwaller 3-8 Stöckli; Stöckli 6-4 Schwaller

United States

The U.S. Olympic trials were held February 19–26, 2005 in McFarland, Wisconsin. They double as the qualifying tournament to the 2005 Ford World Men's Curling Championship and the 2005 Ford World Women's Curling Championship.  Results:

 Women 

Tie-breaker
Sormunen 13-10 Wright

Playoffs
3 vs. 4: Lank (3) 9-4 Sormunen (4)
1 vs. 2: McCormick (2) 8-6 Johnson (1)
Semi-final: Johnson 8-7 Lank
Final: Johnson 5-4 McCormick

 Men 

Tie-breaker
Brown 9-2 Clark
Brown 11-8 Baird

Playoffs
3 vs. 4: Clark (4) 5-4 Baird (3)
1 vs. 2: Fenson (1) 9-3 Brown (2)
Semi-final: Brown 7-6 Clark
Final: Fenson 7-3 Brown

Japan
The Japanese Olympic trials were held November 23, 2005 in Tokoro, Hokkaidō. Two teams, from Nagano (skipped by Yukako Tsuchiya) and Aomori (skipped by Ayumi Onodera) were eligible, with Aomori having the championship team.  Therefore, Nagano had to win two games against Aomori to win, while Aomori needed to win either of the games.

 Women 
Playoffs
Game 1: Onodera 5-2 Tsuchiya
Game 2: Not needed

Other nations
The teams for most of the other nations were selected by a committee, usually by the governing body of the sport in that nation. The countries qualified based on a point system based on World Championship results. Note that these tables show the results of the Scotland team, at the Olympics, Scotland, as a country of the United Kingdom and a non-sovereign entity, competes under the name "Great Britain"''.  The same point system of 12 points for the winner was used in 2005 World Championships even though the event was expanded to 12 teams from 10.

Men's

Women's

References

External links
2006 Winter Olympics - Curling
Canadian Olympic Curling Trials (TSN)
German Olympic Curling Trials
Swiss Olympic Curling Trials
US Olympic Curling Trials
Japanese Curling Trials

 
2006 Winter Olympics events
2006

2006 in curling
International curling competitions hosted by Italy